Skrautvål Church is a parish church of the Church of Norway in Nord-Aurdal Municipality in Innlandet county, Norway. It is located in the village of Skrautvål. It is the church for the Skrautvål parish which is part of the Valdres prosti (deanery) in the Diocese of Hamar. The white, wooden church was built in a cruciform design in 1785 using plans drawn up by the architect Svend Tråseth. The church seats about 230 people.

History
The earliest existing historical records of the church date back to the year 1311, but the church was not built that year. The first church in Skrautvål was a wooden stave church that was likely built during the late 13th century (probably around the year 1280).

Plans for a new church were made during the 1780s. The church was built and consecrated in 1785. The old church was torn down after the new church was completed. The new church was a wooden cruciform building. In 1861, a church porch was built on the west end of the church. In 1890, a new sacristy was built on the east end of the building. In 1907, the windows and a door were replaced.

See also
List of churches in Hamar

References

Nord-Aurdal
Churches in Innlandet
Cruciform churches in Norway
Wooden churches in Norway
18th-century Church of Norway church buildings
Churches completed in 1785
13th-century establishments in Norway